John Sinnott VC (1829 – 20 July 1896) was born in Wexford and was an Irish recipient of the Victoria Cross, the highest and most prestigious award for gallantry in the face of the enemy that can be awarded to British and Commonwealth forces.

Details
He was about 28 years old, and a lance corporal in the 84th Regiment (later the 2nd Battalion, York and Lancaster Regiment), British Army during the Indian Mutiny when the following deed took place on 6 October 1857 at Lucknow, British India for which he was awarded the VC:

Further information
Elected by the regiment. He later achieved the rank of Sergeant. He died at Clapham, London on 20 July 1896.

The medal
His Victoria Cross is displayed at The York & Lancaster Regiment Museum, Rotherham, South Yorkshire, England.

References

Listed in order of publication year 
The Register of the Victoria Cross (1981, 1988 and 1997)

Ireland's VCs  (Dept of Economic Development, 1995)
Monuments to Courage (David Harvey, 1999)
Irish Winners of the Victoria Cross (Richard Doherty & David Truesdale, 2000)

External links
Location of grave and VC medal (Surrey)

1829 births
1896 deaths
19th-century Irish people
Irish soldiers in the British Army
People from Wexford, County Wexford
York and Lancaster Regiment soldiers
Irish recipients of the Victoria Cross
Indian Rebellion of 1857 recipients of the Victoria Cross
British Army recipients of the Victoria Cross